The Northern Counties Motor & Engineering Company was an English builder of bus and coach bodywork based in Wigan.

History

Northern Counties Motor & Engineering Company was founded in Wigan in 1919 by Henry Lewis. The Lewis family remained owners of the company until it was bought out over seventy years later.  As was common at the time, early products were bodywork and repairs for private automobiles together with a tyre fitting service.  By the early 1920s, the private automobile work had ceased and the manufacture of bodywork for service buses commenced. Bodywork was for both single and double deck vehicles. Very few coaches were produced.

During World War II, Northern Counties was authorised by the government to produce bus bodies to a utility specification, mainly using steel-framed construction.

Northern Counties established a loyal client base and reputation for quality construction in the post-war years. Notable clients included local operators SHMD Board, Manchester Corporation and Lancashire United Transport. Further afield, Barton Transport and Southdown Motor Services were among a number of regular customers.

1960s 
In 1967, fellow bodybuilder Massey Brothers, located in nearby Pemberton, was acquired and became a part of the Northern Counties operations.' The Massey factory was retained and used as a paint-shop and for final completion of bodywork assembled at Wigan Lane.

The Transport Act 1968 merged the municipal corporations of Manchester, Salford, Bolton, Oldham, Stockport, Rochdale, Bury and Stalybridge, Hyde, Mossley and Dukinfield Joint Board (SHMD Board). The resulting conglomerate was known as the Southeast Lancashire Northeast Cheshire Passenger Transport Authority, commonly known as SELNEC. SELNEC was faced with a fleet of 2,500 vehicles consisting of a wide variety of types and manufacturers, reflecting the preferences of their former municipal owners. Northern Counties worked closely with SELNEC to develop a standard bus for fleet replacement.

1970s 
The Local Government Act 1972 came into effect on 1 April 1974. This reorganisation added Wigan Corporation Transport to SELNEC to create the Greater Manchester Passenger Transport Executive that was the largest bus operator outside London until privatisation in the late 1980s. A large proportion of Northern Counties production after this time was for the Greater Manchester fleet.

In 1975 the company collaborated with Foden, a well-known manufacturer of commercial vehicles, to produce a semi-integral double-deck vehicle intended to compete with chassis manufacturer Leyland. Leyland had merged with traditional rival Daimler and was experiencing production and quality problems. In the event, only seven Foden NCs were produced, going to Greater Manchester PTE, West Midlands PTE, West Yorkshire PTE, Derby City Transport and Potteries Motor Traction.

1980-1999 
In June 1983, Greater Manchester Transport purchased a 49% shareholding in the business.

In May 1991, Northern Counties was placed in administration.

Northern Counties reputation and engineering skills saw it survive these difficult times and become a major supplier once again as demand picked up in the mid-1990s.  In May 1995, it was purchased for £10 million by the Henlys Group, owner of Plaxton. The Northern Counties name was dropped in 1999, and vehicles were badged as Plaxton.

2000s 
In 2000, Henlys entered a joint venture with the Mayflower Corporation, owner of bodybuilder Alexander and chassis manufacturer Dennis. The joint venture was known as TransBus, and vehicles were badged using the TransBus name.

On 31 March 2004, TransBus International was put into administration. On 21 May 2004, TransBus International was bought by a consortium of merchant banker Noble Grossart, and businessmen David Murray and Brian Souter. The new company was named Alexander Dennis. On 26 January 2005, the former Northern Counties Wigan plant closed, after completing outstanding orders of Plaxton President bodies.

Products
Palatine (double-deck)
Paladin (single-deck)
Prestige (low-floor single-deck)
President (low-floor double-deck)

References

Ogden, Eric; (1976). Northern Counties of Wigan. The Transport Publishing Company. .
Booth, Gavin (1983). The British Bus Today and Tomorrow. Ian Allan Ltd. 
Townsin, Alan (1985). The British Bus Story - The 'Sixties - Turbulent Times. The Transport Publishing Company.

Further reading
Rowe, Bob (2006). Northern Counties of Wigan. Venture Publications Ltd.

External links

 A very useful listing of all bodies built from 1956 to 2005
Detailed history of the development of the SELNEC standard

Defunct bus manufacturers of the United Kingdom
United Kingdom in World War II
History of Wigan
1919 establishments in England
2005 disestablishments in England
British companies established in 1919
Vehicle manufacturing companies established in 1919